Mildura Senior College is a public college for Year 11 & 12 students in the Sunraysia area of Victoria.
Enrolment is approximately 960 students.
The college is located in Deakin Avenue, Mildura, adjacent to the Bambil Football Club and Settlers Cricket Club Oval, near Chaffey Secondary College.

History
In 1890 a foundation stone was laid on the present site, for an intended educational institution to be called Chaffey Agricultural College. This was never built, due to funding issues. 
In 1911 the Education Department of Victoria made a decision to establish a high school on the site. 
Mildura High School was officially opened in September 1912.
In 1990 Mildura High School changed its name to Mildura Secondary College. 
In 1995 the college was again renamed as Mildura Senior College.
In 2014 on Wednesday 30 April, Mildura Senior College held the grand opening of the "Deakin Trade Training Centre".
In 2019 the first performance of local band "The Yokoes" was held to critical acclaim among staff and students.
The school has two sets of course structure for students to follow. VCAL and VCE, VCAL is centered around learning trade skills while VCE is for students who wish to go on and further their schooling at university by achieving an ATAR score.

References

Educational institutions established in 1912
Public high schools in Victoria (Australia)
Mildura
1912 establishments in Australia